Indore was one of the residencies of British India. Indore Residency included most of Indore State, and, after 1933, Rewa State, which formerly belonged to Bagelkhand Agency. It was part of Central India Agency.

British Residents
List of British Residents of the Indore Residency.
1840 - 1844                Sir Claude Martin Wade             (b. 1794 - d. 1861)
1845 - 1859                Robert North Collie Hamilton       (b. 1802 - d. 1887)
1859 - 1861                Sir Richmond Campbell Shakespear   (b. 1812 - d. 1861)
1861 - 1869                Richard John Meade                 (b. 1821 - d. 1899)
1869 - 1881                Henry D. Daly
1881 - 1888                Henry Lepel-Griffin                (b. 1838 - d. 1908)
1888 - 1890                P.F. Henvey
1890 - 1894                R.J. Crosthwaite
1894 - 1899                David W.K. Barr
1899 - 1902                Robert Henry Jennings
1902 - 1903                Francis Younghusband               (b. 1863 - d. 1942)
1903 - 1907                Oswald Vivian Bosanquet (1st time) (b. 1866 - d. 1933)
1907 - 1909                James Levett Kaye                  (b. 1861 - d. 1917)
1909 - 1910                Charles Beckford Luard
1910 - 1916                Charles Lennox Russell
1916 - 1919                Oswald Vivian Bosanquet (2nd time) (s.a.)
1919? - 1921               Francis Granville Beville
1921 - 1924                Denys Brooke Blakeway              (b. 1870 - d. 1933)
1924 - 1929                Sir Reginald Glancy 
Mar 1927 - Oct 1927        Edward Herbert Kealy  (acting for Glancy)
1929 - 1930                H.R.N. Pritchard
1930 - 1931                Frederick Bailey 
1931 - 1932                G.M. Ogilvie
1933 - 21 Mar 1935         Rawdon James MacNabb               (b. 1883 - d. 1935)
1935 - 1940                Kenneth Samuel Fitze               (b. 1887 - d. 1960)
1940 - 1942                Gerald Thomas Fisher
1942 - 1946                Walter F. Campbell
1946 - 1947                Henry Mortimer Poulton             (b. 1898 -  d. 1973)

References

Residencies of British India
1840 establishments in British India
Indore